717 Naval Air Squadron (717 NAS) was a Naval Air Squadron of the Royal Navy's Fleet Air Arm. It formed as a Torpedo Bomber Reconnaissance Training Squadron, at RNAS Fearn, in July 1944, operating with Barracuda aircraft. The squadron then moved to RNAS Rattray, in the October, continuing in Torpedo Bomber Reconnaissance training. In early 1946 the squadron received Firebrand aircraft, with the objective of forming a Firebrand Conversion Unit, however the squadron disbanded in March 1946.

History of 717 NAS

Torpedo Bomber Reconnaissance Training Squadron (1944 - 1946) 

It was equipped with Barracuda Mk II aircraft, a British carrier-borne torpedo and dive bomber. The squadron provided specialist training and put together the trainees into accomplished aircrew.

On the 31 October 1944, the squadron relocated to RNAS Rattray (HMS Merganser), situated near Crimond, Aberdeenshire, Scotland. Here it provided training for Part I of the Torpedo Bomber Reconnaissaince course. Twelve months later, in October 1945, it assisted in disbanding both 714 NAS and 769 NAS.

In February 1946, the squadron received Firebrand II, III and IV aircraft, a British single-engine strike fighter, with the intention of forming a Flight as the Firebrand Conversion Unit, however the aircraft were moved on. 717 NAS disbanded on the 22 March 1946.

Aircraft flown 

The squadron operated a number of different aircraft types:
Fairey Barracuda Mk II (July 1944 - March 1946)
Blackburn Firebrand T.F. II (February 1946 - March 1946)
Blackburn Firebrand T.F. III (February 1946 - March 1946)
Blackburn Firebrand T.F. IV (February 1946 - March 1946)

Naval Air Stations  

717 Naval Air Squadron operated from two naval air stations of the Royal Navy, both in Scotland:
Royal Naval Air Station FEARN (1 July 1946 - 31 October 1944)
Royal Naval Air Station RATTRAY (31 October 1944 - 22 March 1945)

Commanding Officers 

List of commanding officers of 717 Naval Air Squadron with month and year of appointment and end:
Lt-Cdr D. Norcock, RN (Jul 1944-Sep 1944)
Lt-Cdr (A) A. Brunt, DSC, RNZNVR (Sep 1944-Jan 1945)
Lt-Cdr (A) J. L. Fisher, RNVR (Jan 1945-Dec 1945)
Lt (A) H. H. T. Harding, RNVR (Dec 1945-Mar 1946)

References

Citations

Bibliography

700 series Fleet Air Arm squadrons
Military units and formations established in 1944
Military units and formations of the Royal Navy in World War II